The 1947 Jordan League was the 4th season of Jordan League. The championship was won by Al-Ahli for the first time in its history .

References

External links
 Jordan Football Association website

Jordanian Pro League seasons
Jordan
Jordan
1947 in Jordan